Randolph High School is a public high school located in Randolph, Massachusetts, United States, that teaches students in grades 9 through 12.

Academics
Students at Randolph High School must complete specific classes and subjects in order to graduate.
 Four years of English
 Four years of Mathematics
 Three years of History
 Three years of Sciences
 Two years of a Foreign Language
 Four semesters of Physical Education 
 One Year of Fine or Performing Arts
 Enough electives to complete credit requirements

Advanced Placement Courses Offered

 AP Biology
 AP Chemistry 
 AP Physics 1 
 AP Calculus AB
 AP Statistics
 AP English Language and Composition
 AP Psychology
 AP U.S. History

Athletics

Randolph High School is an independent member of the Massachusetts Interscholastic Athletic Association. The school currently has no league affiliation. However, the football team has been accepted as a member of the South Shore League and begins play in the Fall 2013 season.

In 2021, the football team made a Cinderella run in the playoffs and won their first state championship in school history, defeating league rival Hull in the state finals by a score of 20-14

In the fall, the school offers: Boys and Girls Cross Country, Boys and Girls Soccer, Girls Volleyball, and Football. In the winter the athletics options are: Boys and Girls Swimming, Boys and Girls Track and Field, Wrestling, and Boys and Girls Basketball. The school offers for the spring: Boys and Girls Tennis, Boys and Girls Track and Field, Boys and Girls Quidditch, Boys Volleyball, Boys Baseball, and Girls Softball.

Randolph High School also hosts a marching band, named the RHS Marching Blue Devils. In 2014, they began competing in competitions of the New England Scholastic Band Association (NESBA), after a 21-year break. The RHS Marching Blue Devils took home the gold medal in the NESBA Championships every year from 2014 through 2017.

Accomplishments
 2022 Boys' Basketball Division 4 State Champions
 2021 Football Division VIII State Champions
 1990 Massachusetts Math Team Champions
 2008 - 2009 : Boys' Varsity Indoor Track Team - Patriot League Champions
 2008 - 2009 : 4 x 400 Boy's Varsity Indoor Track Relay Team - New England Champions
 2009 - 2010 : Boys' Varsity Indoor Track Team - Patriot League Champions
 2009 - 2010 : Boys' Varsity Indoor Track Team - Division 3 State Runner-Ups
 2010 : Boys' Varsity Tennis Team - Patriot League Champions
 2010 : Boys' Varsity Tennis Team - 18-0 Undefeated Season

References

External links
 

Schools in Norfolk County, Massachusetts
Public high schools in Massachusetts